Sa'dulla Begaliyev (1954 – 17 December 2021) was an Uzbek politician. He served as Minister of Agriculture and Water Resources from 2003 to 2004 and was hokim of Andijan Region from 2004 to 2006.

He died on December 17, 2021 in the city of Tashkent.

References

1954 births
2021 deaths
Uzbekistani politicians
People from Andijan Region